Michele Norsa (born August 12, 1948) is an Italian manager who has had various roles of high responsibility in the publishing and fashion industries. Since October 2, 2006, he has been the Managing and General Director of Salvatore Ferragamo Italia S.p.A.

Career
Graduated in Business and Economics with honors from the Università Cattolica del Sacro Cuore in Milan in 1971, Michele Norsa was appointed CEO and group managing director of Salvatore Ferragamo S.p.A. on 2 October 2006. Currently he also serves on the board of directors of Oettinger Davidoff Group and is a member of the International Advisory Board of the China Europe International Business School (CEIBS). Prior to this, he was General Director of the Valentino Fashion Group S.p.A. He was named General Director of Valentino Fashion Group S.p.A. in July 2005, and before that served as managing director of the Valentino Group since 2002. In the same period, 2002–2006, he covered the role of Vice President of the Executive Committee of Sistema Moda Italia. From 1997-2002 he worked in Marzotto S.p.A., where he had numerous roles: General Director Apparel Sector, President of Marzotto UsA and President of Marzotto France. From 1994 to 1997 he worked in Treviso for Benetton Sportsystem Group as managing director of Sportsystem Active and President of Killer Loop. From 1985 to 1993 he worked in Sandys (Sergio Tacchini Group) and was managing director of the group. From 1976 to 1985 he worked at Rizzoli in Milan as the director of the Rizzoli Group Book Area and as President of the publishing house Sansoni of Florence.

Previously he was the general director and managing director of Editorial Abril, in Buenos Aires, after having served in various other roles within the group in New York City and Geneva. In Arnoldo Mondadori Editore he was the Project Lead for General Development and Direction.

References

 

1948 births
Living people
Italian businesspeople
Università Cattolica del Sacro Cuore alumni